İkinci Şıxlı (also, Ikindzhi-Shikhly, Shikhly, Shykhly Vtoryye, and Vtoryye Shikhly) is a village and municipality in the Qazakh Rayon of Azerbaijan next to the Azerbaijan–Georgia border. It has a population of 3,565.

Notable natives    

 Ali-Agha Shikhlinski — Russian, Azerbaijani and Soviet military commander, deputy Minister of Defense of Azerbaijan Democratic Republic.
 Javad bey Shikhlinski  — Russian, Azerbaijani and Iranian military commander, Major-General.
 Ismayil Shykhly — People's writer of Azerbaijan.
 Kazim agha Salik — poet.
 Mehdi Huseyn — writer and critic.
 Mustafa Agha Arif  — poet.
 Osman Sarivelli — People's Poet of Azerbaijan.

References 

Populated places in Qazax District